The Deutsche Reichsbahn had a standard passenger train tank engine with a wheel arrangement of 1'C1' (UIC classification) or 2-6-2 (Whyte notation) and a low axle load, which was designated in their classification system as the DRG Class 64 (Baureihe 64). The Class 64 was developed from 1926 onwards and it was built between 1928 and 1940. Many German manufacturers contributed to the series.

Construction
The boiler and elements of the driving gear were the same as those on the DRG Class 24. They had Bissel bogies, apart from ten engines which had a Krauss-Helmholtz bogie . From no. 64 368 onwards the engines were 10 cm longer than their predecessors. The Class 64 engine was given the nickname "Bubikopf" ('bob') after a fashionable ladies hairstyle of the time.

Service
After the Second World War 393 engines were still in service of which 278 went to the Deutsche Bundesbahn and 115 to the Deutsche Reichsbahn (East Germany). No. 64 311 remained in Austria after 1945 and became class 64 (Reihe 64) with the Austrian Federal Railways (Österreichische Bundesbahnen or ÖBB). Those engines left in Poland were given the classification OKl2 by the PKP. In 1968 there were still 60 machines in service with the Bundesbahn. Twenty Class 64 locomotives have been preserved, the majority in Germany.

Preserved Locomotives 

While the majority of the class 64s are preserved in Germany, seven of the class are preserved in other countries.
 64 250 with the Chemin de Fer à Vapeur des 3 Vallées in Mariembourg, Belgium
 64 305 with the Nene Valley Railway in England and is currently awaiting overhaul. 
 64 344 with the Passau Railway Society (currently being renovated)
 64 415 with the Veluwsche Stoomtrein Maatschappij in Beekbergen, Netherlands
 64 419 with the DBK Historic Railway in Crailsheim
 64 491 with the Dampfbahn Fränkische Schweiz in Ebermannstadt, Bavaria
 64 518 with the Verein Historische Eisenbahn Emmental (VHE) in Huttwil, Switzerland
 64 061 (Polish State Railways no. OKl2-6) in Jaworzyna Śląska, Poland

See also 
 Deutsche Reichsbahn 
 List of DRG locomotives and railbuses
 Einheitsdampflokomotive for more about the DRG's standard steam locomotives.

References

External links 
 64 491 at the Dampfbahn Fränkische Schweiz e. V.

64
2-6-2T locomotives
64
Railway locomotives introduced in 1928
Passenger locomotives
Standard gauge locomotives of Germany
1′C1′ h2t locomotives
Borsig locomotives
Hanomag locomotives
Henschel locomotives
AEG locomotives
Krupp locomotives
AG Vulcan Stettin locomotives
Humboldt locomotives
Arnold Jung locomotives
Linke-Hofmann locomotives
Orenstein & Koppel locomotives
Esslingen locomotives
Krauss-Maffei locomotives
Schichau-Werke locomotives
Union Giesserei locomotives